The East Wenatchee Clovis Site (also called the Richey-Roberts Clovis Site or the Richey Clovis Cache) is a deposit of prehistoric Clovis points and other implements, dating to roughly 11,000 radiocarbon years before present or about 13,000 calendar years before present, found near the city of East Wenatchee, Washington in 1987. Accidentally discovered in an apple orchard by Mark Mickels, it yielded some of the largest stone Clovis points known to science. After controversy over its excavation, the site was sealed off from further digging from 1992 until 2007.

History 

The site was accidentally uncovered by Mark Mickels and farmworker Moises Aguirre Calzada on May 27, 1987, while installing an irrigation line. His digging unearthed about two dozen stone bifaces, which were at first mistaken for tools left by contemporary Indian tribes. Orchard co-owner Rich Roberts and his wife Joanne later showed the items to local amateur archaeologist Russell S. Congdon, who identified them as Clovis tools and subsequently contacted archaeologist Robert Mierendorf. The tool kit manufactured by the Clovis culture is one of the earliest known in the Americas, persisting from about 11,050 to 10,800 radiocarbon years BP.

The site was named by National Park Service archaeologist Robert Mierendorf, the first professional scientist to examine the cache. After the Robertses and their orcharding partner Dr. Mack Richey opened the site to further study, beginning in 1988, it was referred to as the Richey-Roberts Clovis Site and, later, the Richey Clovis Cache.

An excavation in April 1988, led by Peter J. Mehringer of Washington State University, with a team of leading local and national authorities in Paleo-Indian Archaeology and members of  the Confederated Tribes of the Colville Reservation, discovered 22 more stone and bone tools, but removed only five for laboratory study. Richey, who in November 1988 bought out his partners and became sole owner of the Clovis site, replaced the Mehringer team with New York archaeologist R. Michael Gramly, who then led another dig in October 1990. This excavation became controversial, with members of the Confederated Tribes of the Colville Reservation protesting the state government’s granting of an archaeological permit for Gramly, whose statements and writings questioned a link between Clovis Paleo-Indians and modern Indians. Gramly had also argued against new laws that, in his view, tied the hands of U.S. archaeologists in favor of protecting Indian cultural heritage. In addition, the Tribes objected to the excavation of the site for personal profit.

In light of the dispute, Gramly’s dig proceeded on a shortened time frame, and ultimately removed approximatively 69 artifacts including tools, debitage, and bone fragments before closing the site. An uncertain number of items, including two more bone artifacts, were left in place. In 1992 Richey donated all the recovered Clovis artifacts and sold the archaeological rights to the 35-square-meter site for $250,000 to the Washington State Historical Society, which owns them in perpetuity. The sale contract stipulated that no archaeological work could take place for 15 years after the purchase; that moratorium expired June 1, 2007, although no new scientific digging has since taken place. Richey sold the entire orchard to a new owner in 2004. At this time what was once an archaeological site was re-filled with dirt, covered with a cement slab, and restored to be part of the orchard.

Significance 

The East Wenatchee Clovis Site yielded 36 ancient stone tools and 12 transversely beveled rods of carved and in some cases incised mammoth or mastodon bone, plus scores of stone flakes or "debitage" left over from tool manufacture or maintenance. It was the only intact Clovis site ever found in Washington state, and one of many significant prehistoric finds in the state’s history. The cache held the largest Clovis points then known to science, one of them 9.15 inches (23.25 cm) long, knapped from white agate (also called chalcedony). Before this discovery the largest Clovis points were only measured at around 6 inches. Much of the cache remained "in context" for scientists to explore, meaning it was not overly disturbed by digging prior to archaeological work. Most major Clovis caches have only been explored after they were unearthed and scattered by road projects and construction work, or removed to private collections.

Some researchers postulated that the cache might have represented a large habitation camp; a hunting toolkit, buried and then dug up for seasonal stalking of game; a ceremonial or funeral site; or a ritual offering to stave off ecological harm brought on by the eruption of nearby Glacier Peak, 11,250 radiocarbon years BP, even though the presence of large amounts of debitage and fragmented bone is a good indicator that the site didn't represent a cache at all and the Glacier Peak eruption is thought to have occurred over two centuries before the emergence of the Clovis culture. Some members of Northwest Indian tribes claimed the Clovis hunters as ancestors, and argued against exploring the site out of respect for the dead. The debate helped frame archaeologists’ relationships with local tribes in future research.

The site continues to operate as a commercial apple orchard as of 2007. As researchers Ruth Kirk and Richard D. Daugherty wrote, "Despite all the care taken, certain risks to the site remain. How will orchard chemicals and irrigation water affect bone still in the ground? And what about ongoing bioturbation, the disturbance caused by roots and rodents? The site in the orchard was essentially undisturbed when its window to the past was opened, albeit slightly. It has been sampled but not fully excavated. Enigma remains."

See also

 Clovis culture
 Clovis point
 Paleo-Indians
 Kennewick Man
 East Wenatchee
 Archaeology of the Americas

References
Notes

Bibliography
 Gramly, R.M., The Richey Clovis Cache, Persimmon Press, 1993.
 Kirk, Ruth and Daugherty, Richard D., Archaeology in Washington, University of Washington Press, 2007.
 Marshall, Maureen E. Wenatchee's Dark Past. Wenatchee, Wash: The Wenatchee World, 2008.
 Mierendorf, R. "Comments on the East Wenatchee Clovis Site (45DO482), Washington State, As Reported on by Rilchard M. Gramley", Current Research in the Pleistocene, 1997, V. 14:57-59.
 Mehringer, P. J., Jr., "Clovis cache found: Weapons of ancient Americans", National Geographic Magazine, 1988, 174(4):500-503.
 Mehringer, P. J., Jr., "Apples and Archaeology", Universe (WSU Graduate School Magazine), 1(2):2-8, Reprinted in Mammoth Trumpet 5(2):1, 4-5, 1989.
 Mehringer, P. J., Jr. & F. F. Foit, "Volcanic ash dating of the Clovis cache at East Wenatchee, Washington", national Geographic Research 6(4):495-503, 1990.
 Robbins, Jefferson, "Clovis: Ancient site, modern world," The Wenatchee World, Wenatchee, Wash., May 27, 2007.
Becker, Paula, "Moises Aquirre and Mark Mickels discover prehistoric Clovis point artifacts in an East Wenatchee apple orchard on May 27, 1987.", Oct 3, 2006, www.history link.org.

External links 
 The Clovis Conflict: 1987-1992
 Moises Aguirre and Mark Mickles discover prehistoric Clovis point artifacts in an East Wenatchee apple orchard on May 27, 1987.

Clovis sites
Native American history of Washington (state)
Archaeological sites in Washington (state)
Pre-Columbian archaeological sites
Geography of Douglas County, Washington